Neurotrimin is a protein that in humans is encoded by the NTM gene.

This gene encodes a member of the IgLON (LAMP, OBCAM, Ntm) family of immunoglobulin (Ig) domain-containing glycosylphosphatidylinositol (GPI)-anchored cell adhesion molecules. The encoded protein may promote neurite outgrowth and adhesion via a homophilic mechanism. This gene is closely linked to a related family member, opioid binding protein/cell adhesion molecule-like (OPCML) on chromosome 11. Multiple alternatively spliced variants have been found but only two variants have had their full-length sequences determined.

References

Further reading